Oxosilanol is a chemical compound. It is the silicon-analogue to formic acid, with silicon replacing carbon.

References

Silanols